Kaklık railway station is a railway station in Kaklık, Turkey, about  east of Denizli. TCDD Taşımacılık operates a daily intercity train, the Pamukkale Express, from Eskişehir to Denizli.

Kaklık station was originally built by the Ottoman Railway Company in 1889 and later taken over by the Turkish State Railways in 1934. In 2011 the station platform was rebuilt and the station house renovated along with the construction of a small logistics center.

References

External links
TCDD Taşımacılık

Railway stations in Denizli Province
Railway stations opened in 1889
1889 establishments in the Ottoman Empire